The 2019 African Baseball Championship was the fourth Africa Baseball Championship, after 1999, 2003, and 2007. The Championship was held from May 1 to May 5, 2019, at the Boksburg Baseball Club in Johannesburg, South Africa.

Seventeen national baseball teams in Africa were originally divided into four zones for the 2020 Olympics qualifiers.  Ultimately, there were three regional qualifiers leading up to the 2019 African Baseball Championship, starting in March 2019 at the Labone Secondary School in Labone, a suburb of Accra, in Ghana with ones in Kenya and South Africa in April.

Burkina Faso competed in Zone West 1 against Team Ghana, Team Nigeria, Team Tunisia, and Team Cote d’Ivoire. In April 2019 at the first African West One pre-qualifier for the 2020 Olympics, Team Burkina Faso defeated Team Nigeria (13-3) and Team Ghana (14-4). Burkina Faso was the first team to qualify, followed by  Nigeria, Kenya, Uganda, South Africa and Zimbabwe. Nigeria and Kenya withdrew before the Championship began.  Burkina Faso lost in the semi-final in May to Team South Africa, 16-1.

The winner of the 2019 African Baseball Championship, Team South Africa, advanced to the 2019 Europe-Africa Qualifier for the 2020 Olympics in Italy in September 2019 to face the top five teams from the 2019 European Baseball Championship.

Final ranking

References 

International baseball competitions hosted by South Africa
May 2019 sports events in South Africa
African Baseball Championship
Sports competitions in Johannesburg
2010s in Johannesburg
African Baseball Championship